Aspergillus latus is a species of fungus in the genus Aspergillus. It is from the Nidulantes section. The species was first described in 2016. It has been isolated from soil in Brazil, Geranium nepalense in Japan, fruit in South Africa, cereal in Kenya, and soil in Greenland.

Growth and morphology

A. latus has been cultivated on both Czapek yeast extract agar (CYA) plates and Malt Extract Agar Oxoid® (MEAOX) plates. The growth morphology of the colonies can be seen in the pictures below.

References 

latus
Fungi described in 2016
Taxa named by Charles Thom